Enrico Bonassin (16 May 1901 – 20 May 1971) was an Italian wrestler. He competed at the 1924 and the 1928 Summer Olympics.

References

External links
 

1901 births
1971 deaths
Olympic wrestlers of Italy
Wrestlers at the 1924 Summer Olympics
Wrestlers at the 1928 Summer Olympics
Italian male sport wrestlers
Sportspeople from Genoa
20th-century Italian people